Neville Arthur Irwin French, CMG, LVO (28 April 1920 – 21 April 1996) was Governor of the Falkland Islands and High Commissioner for the British Antarctic Territory from 1975 to 1977.

References 

1920 births
1996 deaths
Governors of the Falkland Islands
Commissioners of the British Antarctic Territory
Companions of the Order of St Michael and St George
Members of the Royal Victorian Order
Place of birth missing